Butler-Henderson may refer to:
Charlie Butler-Henderson (born 1978), British motor racing driver
Capt. The Hon. Eric Butler-Henderson (1884–1953), British soldier and company director
GCR Class 11F locomotive no. 506, named Butler–Henderson after the above
Vicki Butler-Henderson (born 1972), British racing driver and television presenter

See also
Butler (surname)
Henderson (surname)